Rudolf Mellinghoff (born 25 November 1954) is a German judge, jurisprudent and tax law expert who served as President of the Federal Fiscal Court from 2011 to 2020. He was also a justice of the Federal Constitutional Court serving in the court's second senate (2001–2011).

Career
Prior to his appointment to the Federal Constitutional Court, he served as judge at the Federal Fiscal Court from 1997 to 2001. He left the Federal Constitutional Court prematurely to return to the Federal Fiscal Court as its President.

In 2022, Mellinghoff was appointed to the Commission for the Reform of the Electoral Law and the Modernization of Parliamentary Work, co-chaired by Johannes Fechner and Nina Warken.

Other activities
 Max Planck Institute for Tax Law and Public Finance, Member of the Board of Trustees
 International Fiscal Association (IFA), Member of the Permanent Scientific Committee (since 2017)
 Judicial Integrity Group, Member (since 2010)

Recognition
 2006 – Honorary doctorate, University of Greifswald
 2011 – Order of Merit of the Federal Republic of Germany

See also

 Federal Constitutional Court

 Federal Fiscal Court

External links
 Bundesverfassungsgericht -- Justice Mellinghoff's website

References

1954 births
Living people
20th-century German judges
Scholars of tax law
German legal scholars
Justices of the Federal Constitutional Court
Grand Crosses with Star and Sash of the Order of Merit of the Federal Republic of Germany
21st-century German judges